Polyembolokoilamania is the act of inserting foreign bodies into orifices such as the rectum and vagina. It is often exhibited by patients with Smith–Magenis syndrome. When motivated by a desire for sexual gratification, it can be considered a paraphilia.

References

Further reading

Paraphilias
Self-harm
Foreign body